Bare is a surname. Notable people with the surname include:

Bobby Bare (born 1935), American country music singer and songwriter
Bobby Bare Jr. (born 1966), American musician
Howard Bare (1911–2002), mayor of Lancaster, Pennsylvania (1950–1951)
Jeanne Baré (1740–1803), French botanist and seafarer
Kendig C. Bare (1913–1989), twice mayor of Lancaster, Pennsylvania (1950 and 1951–58)
Mike Bare (born 1983), Wisconsin politician
Ray Bare (1949–1994), Major League Baseball pitcher
Richard L. Bare (19132015), American director of television shows and movies
Thomas D. Bare (1867–1931), American newspaper editor and politician